The Kwangmyong Encyclopedia(광명백과사전) is a 20-volume encyclopedia published in North Korea. It includes more than 58,000 entries and 9,000 photos, pictures and maps.

History
The prep work for the encyclopedia began in 2004. The encyclopedia has been published since 2006, and was completed in 2013.

Content
Contents of Book are as follows:
Book 1. History of Korea
Book 2. World History
Book 3. Politics/Law
Book 4.Philosophy
Book 5.Economy
Book 6.Literature/Art
Book 7.Education/Language/Publishing/Broadcasting
Book 8.Korean geography
Book 9.World geography
Book 10.Mathematics
Book 11.Physics
Book 12.Chemistry
Book 13.Life sciences
Book 14.Astronomy,Environment
Book 15.Information,aviation,Nanotechnology
Book 16.Mining/Metal/machinery/electronics
Book 17.chemical engineering/light industries/construction/transport/Postal services
Book 18.Agriculture/forestry/fishery
Book 19.Human body/Health
Book 20.Physical education

See also 
 Great Korean Encyclopedia
 Lists of encyclopedias

References 

Education in North Korea
Korean encyclopedias